101 Dalmatians is an American media franchise owned by The Walt Disney Company and based on Dodie Smith's 1956 novel The Hundred and One Dalmatians. It began in 1961 with the release of the traditionally animated feature film, One Hundred and One Dalmatians. Various adaptations produced from Disney have been released over the years.

Origin
The source for the first film is the 1956 novel The Hundred and One Dalmatians, written by Dodie Smith. From this The Walt Disney Company developed and expanded the franchise into other media.  Smith wrote a 1967 sequel, The Starlight Barking, but this has not been used as source material for any of Disney's work.

Film

Animation

One Hundred and One Dalmatians (1961)

A 1961 American animated adventure comedy-drama film produced by Walt Disney based on the novel by Dodie Smith. The 17th Disney animated feature film, it was originally released to theaters on January 25, 1961 by Buena Vista Distribution.

101 Dalmatians II: Patch's London Adventure (2003)

A 2003 American direct-to-video animated adventure musical comedy-drama film produced by Disney Television Animation, and released by Walt Disney Home Entertainment on January 21, 2003. The film is the sequel to the 1961 Disney animated film One Hundred and One Dalmatians.

The plot involves the titular scrappy puppy who must come to the rescue of his 98 siblings, after villainous Cruella dognaps them once again.

Live action

101 Dalmatians films

101 Dalmatians (1996)

A 1996 American live-action family comedy film written and produced by John Hughes and directed by Stephen Herek. It is the second adaptation of Dodie Smith's 1956 novel The Hundred and One Dalmatians produced by Walt Disney Pictures following the 1961 animated adventure comedy film of the same name. The film stars Glenn Close as Cruella de Vil and Jeff Daniels as Roger, the owner of the 101 dalmatians.

102 Dalmatians (2000)

A 2000 British-American live-action family comedy film directed by Kevin Lima in his directorial debut and produced by Walt Disney Pictures. It is the sequel to the 1996 film 101 Dalmatians and stars Glenn Close reprising her role as Cruella de Vil as she attempts to steal puppies for her "grandest" fur coat yet. Among the puppies she plans to use are the children of Dipstick, a son of Pongo and Perdita. Glenn Close and Tim McInnerny were the only actors from the first film to return for the sequel.

Potential third film
In May 2021, Glenn Close revealed that while working on Cruella as an executive producer, she wrote a new story as a sequel to the films where she would reprise the role of Cruella de Vil. The plot would involve the character in New York City.

Cruella films

Cruella (2021)

A reboot film, centered around Cruella de Vil titled Cruella, an origin story of the character, and take place during the 1970s  starring Emma Stone as the titular character with Emma Thompson, Paul Walter Hauser, Joel Fry, Paul Walter Hauser, Mark Strong, Emily Beecham and Kirby Howell-Baptiste co-starring in supporting roles. The film was directed by Craig Gillespie with a screenplay by Dana Fox and Tony McNamara, from a story by Aline Brosh McKenna, Kelly Marcel, and Steve Zissis. Andrew Gunn and Marc Platt served as producers, and Glenn Close served as the executive producer. Costume designer Jenny Beavan later stated that Close's role on the film's production was to help Stone appear as a younger 1970s portrayal of Close's role in 101 Dalmatians. 

The film was scheduled to be theatrically released on December 23, 2020, but was later pushed back to May 28, 2021 due to the COVID-19 pandemic. The film was eventually released on that date, both theatrically and on Disney+ with Premier Access.

Sequel
Craig Gillespie and each of the film's respective stars expressed interest in a sequel that would have the style of The Godfather Part II. By June 2021, a sequel was announced to be officially in development. Gillespie will return as director with a script by Tony McNamara. In August 2021, Stone closed a deal to reprise her role in the sequel.

Additional crew and production details

Television series

101 Dalmatians: The Series (1997–1998) 

An American animated television series produced by Walt Disney Television Animation in association with Jumbo Pictures. The show ran from 1997 to 1998. It is based on a combination of the 1961 original animated film, and its 1996 live-action remake. The series as a whole, follows the adventures of the numerous puppies from the Disney franchise. Three puppies in particular, Lucky, Rolly and Cadpig, are the main focus of the show along with their friend Spot, a chicken who wants to be a dog.

101 Dalmatian Street (2019–2020) 

A British-Canadian Toon-Boom animated television comedy series, set in 21st-century London, which follows the adventures of Dylan and his sister Dolly. Dylan and Dolly are descendants of Pongo and Perdita, who protect and take care of their 97 younger siblings. After first airing sneak peeks in 2018, the series officially premiered in the UK on March 18, 2019, and concluded on February 22, 2020, after only one series. Meanwhile, in Canada, the entire series was released as a streaming television series on Disney+ on February 28, 2020.

Related productions

Once Upon a Time

An alternate version based on the Disney version of Cruella de Vil appears in the fourth and fifth seasons of the live-action television series Once Upon a Time, where she is portrayed by Victoria Smurfit. In the series, Cruella is a witch who possesses the power to control animals. Smurfit also played other alternate version of the character in the series' penultimate episode, "Homecoming".

Descendants

Cruella de Vil appears in the 2015 American live-action musical Disney Channel Original Movie Descendants, where she is portrayed by Wendy Raquel Robinson. 

The film's plot involves Ben, the teenage son of King Beast and Queen Belle, who invites the exiled children of defeated villains to attend a preparatory school with the heroes' children; among them is Carlos, the 14-year-old son of Cruella, whom she abuses and treats like a servant, making him sleep near the bear traps she uses to guard her fur coats. Along with other villains, Cruella has been exiled to the Isle of the Lost, where she has lived for at least 20 years.

Other media

Video games
 Math Antics with Disney's 101 Dalmatians (1996): a video game developed by Appaloosa Interactive, Disney Interactive and published by Sega on the Sega Pico.
 101 Dalmatians: Activity Center (1996): Part of the Disney's Activity Center series of games released by Disney Interactive.
 101 Dalmatians Print Studio (1997): Part of the Disney's Print Studio series of games released by Disney Interactive.
 Disney's Animated Storybook: 101 Dalmatians (1997): A point-and-click video game released by Disney Interactive for the PC. The game retold the plot of the 1996 live action film through an animated storybook with interactive games, and songs.
 101 Dalmatians: Escape from DeVil Manor (1997): A computer game created by Disney Interactive. The game was based on the 1996 live-action movie, although the character designs were based on the original animated film.
 102 Dalmatians: Puppies to the Rescue (2000): A video game based on the live-action Disney film 102 Dalmatians. The game was released on the Sega Dreamcast and Sony PlayStation.
 102 Dalmatians Activity Center (2001): A part of the Disney's Activity Center series of games, released by Disney Interactive.
 Kingdom Hearts (2002): Pongo, Perdita, and their 99 Puppies are characters in the game. Pongo and Perdita live in a house in Traverse Town after their world was destroyed, their puppies being lost in different worlds, and the game's protagonist, Sora, having to find them in different locations.
 101 Dalmatians II: Patch's London Adventure (2003): An action-adventure/platforming game based on the film of the same name. It was developed by Digital Eclipse Software, Inc. and published by Eidos Interactive for the Sony PlayStation. It was released on November 20, 2003 exclusively in North America.
 Disney Magic Kingdoms (2021): In a limited time Event focused on 101 Dalmatians, Pongo, Perdita, Lucky, Patch, Rolly, Penny and Cruella were included as playable characters, along with some attractions based on locations of the film. In the game, the characters are involved in new storylines that serve as a continuation of the events in the 101 Dalmatians animated film (ignoring other material in the franchise).

Disney Parks and Resorts 
One Hundred and One Dalmatians has a small presence at the Disney Parks and Resorts mainly through shops and occasional shows. Cruella is the only meetable character from the franchise and is usually located on Main Street, U.S.A.

Recurring cast and characters

Reception

Box office and financial performance

Critical and public response

References

Walt Disney Studios (division) franchises
101 Dalmatians
Mass media franchises introduced in 1961
Children's film series
Disney animated film series
Children's animated films
Adventure film series
Comedy franchises
Animated films about dogs
Animated film series